The 2018–19 season was the 120th in the history of Eintracht Frankfurt, a football club based in Frankfurt, Germany. It was their 7th consecutive season and 50th overall in the top flight of German football, the Bundesliga, having been promoted from the 2. Bundesliga in 2012. In addition to the domestic league, Eintracht Frankfurt also were participating in that season's edition of the domestic cup, the DFB-Pokal. This was the 94th season for Frankfurt in the Commerzbank-Arena, located in Frankfurt, Hesse, Germany. The season covered a period from 1 July 2018 to 30 June 2019.

Players

Squad

Transfers

In

Out

Friendly matches

Competitions

Overview

Bundesliga

League table

Results summary

Results by round

Matches

DFB-Pokal

DFL-Supercup

UEFA Europa League

Group stage

Knockout phase

Round of 32

Round of 16

Quarter-finals

Semi-finals

Statistics

Appearances and goals

|-
!colspan="14" style="background:#dcdcdc;text-align:center"| Goalkeepers

|-
!colspan="14" style="background:#dcdcdc;text-align:center"| Defenders

|-
!colspan="14" style="background:#dcdcdc; text-align:center"|Midfielders

|-
!colspan="14" "style=background:#dcdcdc;text-align:center"|Forwards

|-
! colspan=14 style=background:#dcdcdc; text-align:center| Players transferred out during the season

Goalscorers

Last updated: 9 May 2019

Clean sheets

Last updated: 9 May 2019

Disciplinary record

Last updated: 18 April 2019

References

External links
 Official English Eintracht website 
 German archive site
 2018–19 Eintracht Frankfurt season at kicker.de 
 2018–19 Eintracht Frankfurt season at Fussballdaten.de 

2018-19
German football clubs 2018–19 season
2018–19 UEFA Europa League participants seasons